Stara Oselica is a dispersed settlement in the Municipality of Gorenja Vas–Poljane in the Upper Carniola region of Slovenia.

Name
The name Stara Oselica literally means 'old Oselica' (in contrast to nearby Nova Oselica 'new Oselica'). The origin of the name Oselica is uncertain, but is likely derived from the common noun osel 'donkey' (or from the surname Osel derived from that noun). A less likely possibility, argued against by medieval transcriptions, is that the name is derived from the plant name oselica 'pepper-saxifrage'. The toponym Oslica has the same etymology.

Church

The local church is dedicated to the Conversion of Saint Paul. It is a Baroque building from the late 17th or early 18th century. Its belfry is older and was made taller at the time the current church was built. The main altar dates to the first half of the 18th century.

References

External links

Stara Oselica on Geopedia

Populated places in the Municipality of Gorenja vas-Poljane